Antonio Maria Mazzoni (4 January 1717 – 8 December 1785) was an Italian composer.

Born in Milan, the son of a clockmaker, Mazzoni first gained an interest in music at the age of six, and at age fifteen, was sent to study under Swiss German musician and composer, Johann von Griesemer, under who he studied under for three years until 1735. In 1735, he moved to Paris, where he spent the next five years working in multiple high-profile theatres, steadily honing his craft, especially under the mentorship of one particular, Jacques Saint-Antonine before moving to Great Britain, where he spent three years composing music for the King at the time, George II before returning to Milan in 1743. He spent nearly the last ten years of his life in Rome, where he died on 8 December 1785 at the age of 68, perhaps following a stroke.

Operas
Siroe, re di Persia (opera seria, libretto di Pietro Metastasio, 1746, Fano)
L'Issipile (opera seria, libretto di Pietro Metastasio, 1747 or 1748, Macerata)
La Didone abbandonata (opera seria, libretto di Pietro Metastasio, 1752 or 1753, Bologna)
Il Demofoonte (opera seria, libretto di Pietro Metastasio, 1754, Parma)
Achille in Sciro (opera seria, libretto di Pietro Metastasio, 1754, Piacenza)
L'astuzie amorose (opera buffa, 1754, Piacenza)
La clemenza di Tito (opera seria, libretto di Pietro Metastasio, 1755, Lisbon)
Antigono (opera seria, libretto di Pietro Metastasio, 1755, Lisbon)
Ifigenia in Taurride (opera seria, libretto di Marco Coltellini, 1756, Treviso)
Il viaggiatore ridicolo (opera buffa, libretto di Carlo Goldoni, 1757, Parma)
Il re pastore (a.k.a.Aminta, opera seria, libretto di Pietro Metastasio, 1757, Bologna)
Arianna e Teseo (opera seria, libretto di Pietro Pariati, 1758, Teatro San Carlo di Napoli con Giusto Fernando Tenducci)
L'Eumene (opera seria, libretto di Apostolo Zeno, 1759, Teatro Regio di Torino diretta da Giovanni Battista Somis con Gaetano Guadagni)
L'astuto ciarlatano (intermezzo, 1760, Bologna)
Le stravaganze del caso (intermezzo, 1760, Bologna)
Adriano in Siria (opera seria, libretto di Pietro Metastasio, 1760, Venezia)
Il mercante fallito (faresetta, libretto di A. Boschi, 1762, Roma)
Nitteti (opera seria in tre atti, libretto di Pietro Metastasio, 1764, Teatro San Carlo di Napoli con Caterina Gabrielli ed Anton Raaff)
L'inglese in Italia (dramma giocoso, 1769, Teatro Comunale di Bologna)

References

External links
 

1717 births
1785 deaths
Italian male classical composers
Italian opera composers
Male opera composers
18th-century Italian composers
18th-century Italian male musicians
Musicians from Milan